Carrington is a rural locality in the Tablelands Region, Queensland, Australia.

History 
The town was originally named Scrubby Creek. However, in 1883 it was renamed Carrington after the police magistrate at Herberton. The first town survey was in 1884.

Carrington Provisional School opened on 6 July 1891. On 1 January 1909, it became Carrington State School. It closed in 1937.

References 

Tablelands Region
Localities in Queensland